
Karl Johan Roger Tallroth, born in 1958, is a Swedish folk musician and composer, best known as a former member of the band Väsen. He was educated at the Sjövik Folk High School and the School of Music in Örebro University. Principally a guitarist, he also plays other stringed instruments such as the bouzouki, ukulele, mandola, mandolin, fiddle, viola, oud and double bass. He also works as an arranger, and teaches at both the Royal College of Music in Stockholm and in Örebro University. Tallroth was a founding member of Väsen, however in 2020 he announced his departure from the band to focus on other projects.

In groups such as Väsen, Tallroth has created a personal playing style which often includes alternative tunings (especially A-D-A-D-A-D on the guitar) and distinct rhythmic patterns.

He has worked with musicians such as Annbjørg Lien and Sofia Karlsson, and collaborated on the theatrical production Hästen och tranan.

Discography

With Väsen 
Väsen, 1990
Vilda Väsen, 1992
Essence, 1994
Luke, 1994
Tallroth, 1994
Levande Väsen (Väsen Live), 1995
Spirit, 1997
Världens Väsen (Whirled), 1997
Gront, 1999
Live at the Nordic Roots Festival, 2001
Trio, 2003
Keyed Up, 2004
Live in Japan, 2005
Linnaeus Väsen, 2007
Mike Marshall and Darol Anger with Väsen, 2007
Väsen Street, 2009
Mindset, 2013
Live på Gamla Bion, 2014
Väsen Brewed, 2017
Rule of 3, 2019

With Annbjørg Lien 
Felefeber
Prisme
Baba Yaga
Aliens Alive

Other 
Hästen och tranan
Jul i folkton: I solvändets tid
Jul i folkton
 Dreamers' Circus (EP) 2010 (with Dreamers' Circus)
 Sandum/Tallroth, 2023. With Øyvind sandum

References

External links 
 Roger Tallroth on MySpace

Swedish folk musicians
1958 births
Living people